Golden West Humanitarian Foundation is an American Non-profit (501C3) organisation that develops technology to address the technical limitations of humanitarian mine clearance. 
The Golden West Humanitarian Foundation is based in Woodland Hills, Los Angeles, California.

History 
The Golden West Humanitarian Foundation was founded in 1998 to address shortcomings in humanitarian mine clearance.

Role in Mine Action

Research and development

Explosive Harvesting Program 
The Explosive Harvesting Program (EHP) is a manufacturing program which recycles the explosives contained in stockpiled explosive ammunition into the explosive charges used for humanitarian mine clearance.

Cluster Munitions Destruction 
In 2010, the GWHF worked with Norwegian People's Aid in a groundbreaking cluster bomb stockpile destruction program.

Mine Risk Education (MRE)

Undercover UXO: Game for $100 Laptop (OLPC) 
GWHF partnered with the Michigan State University M.I.N.D. Lab to develop a game for the One Laptop Per Child (OLPC) platform that teaches children the indicators of land mine and unexploded ordnance contamination. 
This game underwent field trials in Cambodia in June 2010.

Indicator Program 
The Golden West Humanitarian Foundation has developed what they call the "Indicator Program", which trains people of all ages how to recognize the indicators of land mine and UXO contamination.  This program has been deployed in Mozambique, Angola and Azerbaijan, and Cambodia.

Vinh & Trinh's Adventure 
The GWHF published a 34-page illustrated storybook titled Vinh & Trinh's Adventure.  The book is designed to teach Vietnamese children the dangers of unexploded ordnance, and it has received positive reviews. In 2010, the book underwent a third round of distribution, bring the total number of book published to 6,000.

Current Operations

Cambodia 
In Cambodia, the Golden West Humanitarian Foundation is partnered with the Cambodian Mine Action Center (CMAC) to provide research and development support to mine action activities in the Kingdom of Cambodia.  These activities include the Explosive Harvesting Program, Mine Risk Education

Central America 
The Golden West Humanitarian Foundation has undertaken ordnance stockpile destruction programs for the Organization of American States.

Vietnam 
In 2009, the GWHF partnered with the Vietnam Veterans Memorial Foundation to undertake a research and development project sponsored by the U.S. Department of State.

Past Operations

Angola 
In Angola, the Golden West Humanitarian Foundation has introduced their "Indicator Program", a Mine Risk Education program designed to teach the indicators of land mine and UXO contamination.

Azerbaijan 
In Azerbaijan, the Golden West Humanitarian Foundation has introduced their "Indicator Program", a Mine Risk Education program designed to teach the indicators of land mine and UXO contamination.

Moldova 
In 2009 & 2010, the GWHF worked on a cluster bomb disposal project in the Republic of Moldova.

Mozambique 
In Mozambique, the Golden West Humanitarian Foundation has introduced their "Indicator Program", a Mine Risk Education program designed to teach the indicators of land mine and UXO contamination.

Nicaragua 
In Nicaragua, the Golden West Humanitarian Foundation has worked with the Organization of American States on stockpile destruction programs.

References

External links 
 Official GWHF Website 
 U.S. State Department  Humanitarian Mine Action and Unexploded Ordnance Removal report, 15th anneversity of U.S.-Vietnam Relations.
 Golden West HF Partners with Don Bosco Foundation
 Photos of Golden West HF by Ben Johnson
 U.S. DOD Humanitarian Demining R&D Partners List
 LA Times article on GWHF.

Mine warfare and mine clearance organizations
Charities based in California